Julita Macur (born 1 March 1959 in Zielona Góra) is a Polish sport shooter. She competed in pistol shooting events at the Summer Olympics in 1992 and 1996.

Olympic results

References

1959 births
Living people
ISSF pistol shooters
Polish female sport shooters
Shooters at the 1992 Summer Olympics
Shooters at the 1996 Summer Olympics
Olympic shooters of Poland
People from Zielona Góra
20th-century Polish women